The Damned Don't Cry is a compilation album by the British synthpop group Visage released in 2000.

The album is the only Visage compilation to date that includes all nine of the band's UK singles (either in their 7", 12", or album version formats). It also includes various album tracks and B-sides from the band's history. The first pressings of the album had the track "Second Steps" included instead of "The Steps", lasting 5:26.

Track listing
"Visage" (Steve Strange, Midge Ure, Billy Currie, John McGeoch, Rusty Egan, Dave Formula) – 3:49
"Tar" (S. Strange, M. Ure, B. Currie, J. McGeoch, R. Egan, D. Formula, Barry Adamson) – 3:32
"Fade to Grey" (B. Currie, M. Ure, Chris Payne) – 3:49
"Mind of a Toy" (S. Strange, M. Ure, B. Currie, J. McGeoch, R. Egan, D. Formula) – 3:33
"Night Train" (S. Strange, M. Ure, B. Currie, R. Egan, D. Formula) – 4:40
"Whispers" (S. Strange, M. Ure, B. Currie, R. Egan, D. Formula) – 5:38
"The Anvil" (S. Strange, M. Ure, B. Currie, R. Egan, D. Formula) – 4:41
"We Move" (Dance Mix) (S. Strange, M. Ure, B. Currie, J. McGeoch, R. Egan, D. Formula) – 6:30
"Pleasure Boys" (Dance Mix) (S. Strange, R. Egan, B. Currie, D. Formula, S. Barnacle) – 6:55
"Love Glove" (S. Strange, R. Egan, S. Barnacle) – 4:03
"Damned Don't Cry" (S. Strange, M. Ure, B. Currie, R. Egan, D. Formula) – 4:46
"Beat Boy" (S. Strange, R. Egan, S. Barnacle, D. Formula, A. Barnett) – 6:48
"She's a Machine" (S. Strange, R. Egan, S. Barnacle, G. Barnacle, A. Barnett) – 4:50
"In the Year 2525" (Rick Evans) – 3:41
"The Steps" (S. Strange, M. Ure, B. Currie, J. McGeoch, R. Egan, D. Formula) – 3:16
"Frequency 7" (Dance Mix) (S. Strange, M. Ure, B. Currie, J. McGeoch, R. Egan, D. Formula, B. Adamson) – 5:07

References

2000 compilation albums
Albums produced by Midge Ure
Polydor Records compilation albums
Visage (band) albums